Vladimir Salmanovich Maksimov (born October 14, 1945 in Kant, Kirghiz SSR) is a Soviet/Russian handball player. After his retirement as a player, he was a coach for the Russian national team, with which he won all three major titles in handball (European champion in 1996, world champion twice in 1993 and 1997 and Olympic champion in 2000). As an active player, he was on the team who competed in the 1972 Summer Olympics (three matches played, fifth place) and in the 1976 Summer Olympics (gold medal).

Awards and titles 
 Honored Master of Sports USSR (1973)
 Honored coach of Russia
 Order For Merit to the Fatherland III class (April 19, 2001) – for his great contribution to the development of physical culture and sports, high sports achievements at the Games of the XXVII Olympiad in Sydney in 2000 '
 Order For Merit to the Fatherland IV class (September 11, 1998) – for services to the state, many years of hard work and great contribution to strengthening friendship and cooperation between nations
 Order of the Red Banner of Labour (1976)

References

External links
profile

1945 births
Living people
Presidents of the Handball Union of Russia
Soviet male handball players
Russian male handball players
Russian handball coaches
Handball players at the 1972 Summer Olympics
Handball players at the 1976 Summer Olympics
Olympic handball players of the Soviet Union
Olympic gold medalists for the Soviet Union
Olympic medalists in handball
Recipients of the Order "For Merit to the Fatherland", 3rd class
Medalists at the 1976 Summer Olympics